Noel Robinson may refer to:

 Noel Robinson (businessman) (born 1943), New Zealand businessman and philanthropist
Noel Robinson (cricketer) (born 1941), Trinidadian cricketer
 Noel Robinson (musician) (born 1962), British Christian musician
 Noel Robinson (writer) (born 1928), Australian writer